The , branded  is a hybrid electric/diesel deluxe sleeping-car excursion train operated by the East Japan Railway Company (JR East) since 1 May 2017. The Train Suite Shiki-shima is one of the world's most exclusive and expensive trains.

Design
The train uses a new "EDC" electric/diesel hybrid propulsion system, enabling the train to operate as an electric multiple unit under overhead electric wires or use two diesel generators in the end cars to power the train's traction motors on non-electrified routes.

Cars 1 to 4 and 8 to 10 were built by Kawasaki Heavy Industries in Kobe, while the three bilevel cars 5 to 7 were built by J-TREC in Yokohama. The Kawasaki-built cars have aluminium bodies, while the three J-TREC-built cars have stainless steel bodies.

The train styling and interior decoration of the train was overseen by industrial designer Ken Okuyama, and is advertised as using only the best quality materials and exemplifying traditional Japanese craftsmanship. Its overall design is reminiscent of the 251 series, also used by JR East.

Train formation
The ten-coach train consists of six sleeping cars, a lounge car, a dining car, and observation cars at either end of the train. Five of the sleeping cars each have three private suite rooms, while one car (car 7) has two deluxe suites - a split-level "maisonette" type and a single-level "flat" type. The train formation is as shown below, formed of six motored ("M") cars and four non-powered trailer ("T") cars, and car 1 at the southern end. All suites have a shower and toilet. The two deluxe suites also each have a bathtub. One suite in car 4 is universal access. The entire train accommodates only 34 passengers.

 Cars 2, 3, 8 and 9 are each fitted with a single-arm pantograph.

Planned itineraries
The train operates on two-day and four-day circular tours from spring to autumn, and on three-day tours during the winter period, as shown below. Tickets cost between $2,860 to around $10,000. The Train Suite Shiki-shima operates itineraries that are crafted based on the season of travel to ensure guests experience the best of each location visited.

2-day itinerary (spring - autumn)
Day 1  →  →  (overnight onboard train)
Day 2  → Ueno

4-day itinerary (spring - autumn)

Day 1  →  (overnight onboard train)
Day 2  →  →  (overnight at hotel accommodation)
Day 3  →  →  →  →  (overnight onboard train)
Day 4  →  →  →  → Ueno

3-day itinerary (winter)

Day 1  →  →  (overnight onboard train)
Day 2  →  (overnight onboard train)
Day 3  → Ueno

History

JR East first announced its plans to build a new luxury cruising train in June 2013, designed by Ken Okuyama, and provisionally scheduled to enter service some time after spring 2016. A year later, in June 2014, JR East published more detailed plans for the new train, with a revised exterior design and service entry date scheduled for spring 2017. The train's name and logo design were officially announced in October 2014. Details of the planned itineraries were published in December 2015.

The first seven cars (1 to 4 and 8 to 10) of the ten-car trainset were delivered from the Kawasaki Heavy Industries factory in Kobe in September 2016. Main line test running commenced on 14 September 2016 on the Joban Line as a seven-car formation. Cars 5 to 7 were delivered from the J-TREC factory in Yokohama on 27 September 2016.

The service was launched formally on 1 May 2017. It attracted great interest, with tickets for the inaugural journey made available via a lottery that was reported to have been oversubscribed by a factor of 76. By the time of the launch, tickets were sold out until March 2018.

See also
 List of named passenger trains of Japan
 Joyful Train, the generic name for excursion and charter trains in Japan
 Seven Stars in Kyushu, a luxury cruising train operated in Japan by JR Kyushu
 Twilight Express Mizukaze, a luxury sleeping car excursion train operated by JR West in Japan
 James May: Our Man in Japan, episode two

References

Further reading

External links

  
 Shiki-Shima photos
 JR East June 2014 news release 

Named passenger trains of Japan
Hybrid multiple units of Japan
East Japan Railway Company
Train-related introductions in 2017
Kawasaki multiple units
J-TREC multiple units